This is a list of crossings of the Derbyshire Derwent, the principal river of Derbyshire in the Midlands of England.

Listed in the table are those crossings that have been identified from the first formal crossing at the packhorse bridge at Slippery Stones, in the upper Derwent valley, continuing through the Derwent Valley Mills heritage site to Derby, to the last crossing near Church Wilne upstream of Derwent Mouth where the Derwent meets the River Trent.

Described by Defoe in 1726 as a "fury of a river" the Derwent could only be forded at a number of particular locations, which could still be impassable during winter floods. Wooden bridges provided for a more reliable crossing, but were easily damaged by those same floods. The wooden bridge at Leadmill was destroyed before it was completed in the early 1700s. Toad-Moor Bridge near Ambergate was rebuilt as Halfpenny Bridge by Francis Hurt in 1792, after being swept away in a flood of 1791. In the Candlemas flood of February 1795, the bridges at Belper and Whatstandwell were washed away, but were subsequently rebuilt soon after.

Glover in his History of the County of Derby of 1829 noted that there were a number of bridges, fords and a ferry across the Derwent. There were fords at Wilne Mills, Alvaston, Little Eaton and Ambaston, and a ferry at Matlock Bath. Wooden bridges were mentioned at Wilne Mills, Borrowash Mills and Exeter Bridge, downstream of which was a long wooden bridge for canal towing horses. Tolls were levied at Wilne Mills, Darley Abbey, and Milford, where there was also a chain-bridge for mill workers. He also recorded a number of county bridges and stone-arched bridges, the majority of which are now listed structures, and in some cases scheduled monuments. A number of these bridges were built by the local industrial families of the Derwent valley, including those of Hurt, Strutt and Evans.

Crossings

Bibliography

References

External links

 
Derwent,Derbyshire
Derwent, Derbyshire
Derwent